Down the Street was a gay nightclub in Asbury Park, New Jersey, United States.

History
It was opened in 1988 by John Hitchcock, previously manager and DJ at another club, M&K. The name 'Down the Street' was used because it was located down the street from other popular gay clubs, Odyssey and M&K. 

The club had a dance floor, five bars, light shows, and drag contests. It also had an outside area which included a volleyball court, food cart and another building which housed a quieter bar, The Clubhouse. When Asbury Park declined in the 1980s, all of the other gay clubs in the city closed or were razed. However, Down the Street managed to stay open, and when it closed in 1999 it was the oldest and longest-operating gay disco in New Jersey's history. Hitchcock moved to Florida with his partner and opened a bar called The Cubby Hole.

The resident DJ at Down The Street was Billy Krauter, and other DJs who appeared included Steven Issac and DJ Robert Randy Koska, both of whom played at the opening night in the 1980s and closing night in 1999. The club also hosted performances by artists including Thelma Houston, Sybil and Kristine W.

Anybody's
In 2001, another gay bar, Anybody's, was opened in the small separate building at the back of the club known as "The Clubhouse". The bar closed on June 24, 2006, and was demolished by the city under eminent domain in 2007.

References

1988 establishments in New Jersey
1999 disestablishments in New Jersey
Asbury Park, New Jersey
Defunct LGBT nightclubs in the United States
LGBT history in New Jersey
LGBT nightclubs in New Jersey
1988 in LGBT history
Companies established in 1988